Seeing Is Believing was a live tour by English magician Dynamo. The tour was initially billed as a run of UK dates in late 2015, beginning at the O2 Apollo, Manchester, visiting London, Glasgow, Edinburgh, Nottingham, Birmingham and Leeds.

Frayne's ambitions for the show were high, commenting to the press that “[he was] hoping that like [he] did for magic on TV, [he could] reinvent the live magic show and produce something fans [had] never seen before.”

Following high demand for tickets, the tour was extended to a three years and 145 dates across 3 continents, where he sold over 750,000 tickets and filled arenas across the UK, Australia, South Africa and New Zealand.

As part of the tour, Dynamo became the first magician in history to headline The O2, London.

Dynamo Live at the O2 
In March 2016, Dynamo played three sold-out shows at The O2, London. In doing so, he became the first magician to headline the venue. To mark the occasion, Dynamo worked with TV channel Watch, with whom he had created his TV show Dynamo: Magician Impossible, to bring his live show to TV screens across the United Kingdom.

Dynamo Live at The O2 followed Frayne as he embarked on the biggest live magic performance in British history. The show was broadcast live across the UK on Watch.

Tour

2015

UK

2016

UK

Australia

2018

South Africa

New Zealand

References

External links
 

Concert tours of the United Kingdom